Old Age Handicap is a 1928 American silent drama film directed by Frank S. Mattison and starring Alberta Vaughn, Gareth Hughes and Vivian Rich.

Cast
 Alberta Vaughn
 Gareth Hughes
 Vivian Rich
 Olaf Hytten
 Mavis Villiers
 Robert 'Buddy' Shaw
 Jimmy Humes
 Carolyn Wethall
 Robert Rodman
 Frank Mattison Jr.
 Ford Jessen
 Hall Cline
 Edna Hearn
 Arthur Hotaling

References

Bibliography
 Brent E. Walker. Mack Sennett’s Fun Factory: A History and Filmography of His Studio and His Keystone and Mack Sennett Comedies, with Biographies of Players and Personnel. McFarland, 2013.

External links

1928 films
1928 drama films
Silent American drama films
American silent feature films
1920s English-language films
American black-and-white films
Films directed by Frank S. Mattison
1920s American films